India International Bullion Exchange (IIBX) is India's first bullion exchange, launched on 29 July 2022 in Gujarat. IIBX was launched in the International Financial Services Center (IFSC). It is the 3rd exchange of its kind in the globe.

References 

Economy of India
Bullion dealers